The Rayburn House Office Building (RHOB) is a congressional office building for the U.S. House of Representatives in the Capitol Hill neighborhood of Washington, D.C., between South Capitol Street and First Street.

Rayburn is named after former Speaker of the House Sam Rayburn.  It was completed in 1965 and at 2.375 million square feet (220,644 m2) is the largest congressional office building and the newest House office building (the only newer congressional office building is the Hart Senate Office Building, completed in 1982).

History
Rayburn was completed in early 1965 and is home to the offices of 169 representatives.

Earlier efforts to provide space for the House of Representatives had included the construction of the Cannon House Office Building and the Longworth House Office Building.  In March 1955, House Speaker Sam Rayburn introduced an amendment for a third House office building, although no site had been identified, no architectural study had been done, and no plans prepared.

The area west of the Longworth Building on squares 635 and 636 was chosen, with the main entrance on Independence Avenue and garage and pedestrian entrances on South Capitol Street, C Street, and First Street Southwest. The cornerstone was laid in May 1962, and full occupancy began in February 1965.

Architecture

The Architect of the Capitol, J. George Stewart, with the approval of the House Office Building Commission, selected the firm of Harbeson, Hough, Livingston & Larson of Philadelphia to design a stripped-down classical building in architectural harmony with other Capitol Hill structures.  However, while the interior design of the other House Office Buildings retains decor one would expect to see in House Office Buildings (with cherry wood paneling, brass railings, and marble floors), the Rayburn building possesses design style parallel to that of the 1960s, with chrome push bars, clocks, and elevators, and space-age fluorescent lighting fixtures.

The Capitol Subway System, an underground transportation system, connects the building to the Capitol.  Pedestrian tunnels also connect the Rayburn building to the Capitol and to the Longworth House Office Building.  This system allows the Rayburn building to be connected to most of the Congressional office buildings on Capitol Hill via tunnel (the Ford House Office Building is freestanding and attached to no other structures by tunnel).

For construction of the Rayburn House Office Building, the Congressional bill appropriated $2 million plus "such additional sums as may be necessary."  Such additional sums eventually exceeded $99 million. Congressional leaders inserted a gymnasium into the building plans, a fact that was not publicly known at the time of construction.  The gym is below the sub-basement level, in a level of the underground parking garage, and according to The Hill, a newspaper focused on Capitol Hill, "features dozens of cardio machines outfitted with TV screens, an array of Cybex weightlifting machines and free weights."
Also in the third floor basement is a shooting range run by the U.S. Capitol Police and a basketball court.

FBI raid
On May 20, 2006 FBI agents raided the Rayburn Building office of Democratic Congressman William J. Jefferson in connection to an ongoing bribery investigation, marking the first time the FBI had raided the office of a sitting congressman.  The raid led to members of both parties questioning the constitutionality of the action, and a subsequent hearing by the House Judiciary Committee.  The legality of the raid was challenged in court, where a federal appeals court ruled that the FBI had violated the Speech or Debate clause of the United States Constitution by allowing the executive branch to review materials that were part of the legislative process.

2006 shooting reports

On May 26, 2006, at 10:30 am local time, there were reports of the sounds of gunfire in the garage of the building.  The Capitol complex was sealed off, and staff in the building were told to stay in their offices after the building was put into lockdown by the United States Capitol Police.  Some parts of the lockdown were removed, though other areas remained sealed.

Congressman Jim Saxton was reportedly the source of the false alarm, after he mistook construction sounds in the garage for gunfire.

See also
Congressional office buildings
Cannon House Office Building
Ford House Office Building
Longworth House Office Building

References

External links

Congressional office buildings
Government buildings completed in 1965
Neoclassical architecture in Washington, D.C.
1965 establishments in Washington, D.C.
Southwest Federal Center